Easter Water is the name given to water used in rituals during the Easter Vigil in the Catholic Church. A part of this water is set aside for use as a sacramental in the church and at home, the remainder being ceremonially mixed with consecrated oils and used for baptisms in the church.

Religious Ritual 
Easter Water is water blessed in special ceremonies on Holy Saturday (as in the Roman Catholic Church) at sunrise, or during the last few minutes before dawn. Part of the ceremony involves lowering the Easter Candle into the blessed water three times, representing the death and rebirth of Christ. The water symbolizes life and death, as well as repentance of sin and rebirth into a new life. In the Catholic Church, the Easter Water is then used for baptisms after the Easter Vigil.

Prayer 

The water is blessed by religious leaders using the following prayer:

"Whatever it sprinkles in the homes of the faithful, may it be cleansed and delivered from harm. Let such homes enjoy a spirit of goodness and an atmosphere of tranquility, freed from harmful or hidden snares. By the sprinkling of this water, may everything opposed to the safety of them that dwell there be banished, so that they may possess the well-being they seek in calling upon Thy holy Name, protected from every evil."

Geographical Implementation 
In Normandy, Saxony, and Silesia, Easter Water is thought to have dermatological properties against eczema, acne, and even leprosy. In Quebec and northern regions of France, it is believed to also have healing effects on vision and is used as a valuable eye lotion. Easter Water has also been used for the treatment of diarrhea and fever.

In Quebec, it was thought to protect against elements such as lightning, thunder, and even the wind. It was also believed to keep away evil spirits, misfortunes, and fatalities. Easter Water is still used in ceremonies to bless homes using the blessed branches.

Washing in Easter Water was believed to afford long-lasting freshness of the skin and to give women, who bathed in a stream or river on the eve of Easter, "beauty and seduction, provided it had done so in silence and in secret." It is also said that men plunged into a river on Easter morning to "gain strength and health throughout the year."

References

Easter liturgy